Thomas George Johnston (August 4, 1849 – July 4, 1905) was a Canadian physician and politician.

Born in Sarnia, Canada West, was educated at the public and grammar schools of Sarnia. He graduated in medicine from McGill College and took up his father's practice in Sarnia. He was Mayor of Sarnia for two terms (1896 and 1897) and Chairman of the Board of Health and a School Trustee. He was first elected to the House of Commons of Canada for Lambton West in an 1898 by-election. A Liberal, he was re-elected in 1900 and 1904. He served in the Canadian militia and participated in the Fenian raids between 1866 and 1871. He died in office in 1905.

References
 
 The Canadian Parliament; biographical sketches and photo-engravures of the senators and members of the House of Commons of Canada. Being the tenth Parliament, elected November 3, 1904

External links
List of Sarnia Mayors

1849 births
1905 deaths
Liberal Party of Canada MPs
Mayors of Sarnia
McGill University Faculty of Medicine alumni
Members of the House of Commons of Canada from Ontario